Pesquet's parrot (Psittrichas fulgidus), also known as the Dracula parrot or as the vulturine parrot (leading to easy confusion with Pyrilia vulturina from Brazil), is the only member of its genus. It is endemic to hill and montane rainforest in New Guinea.

Description
Its plumage is black, with greyish scaling to the chest, and a red belly, uppertail coverts and wing-panels. The adult male has a red spot behind the eye, which is not seen in the adult female. Compared to most other parrots it appears unusually small-headed, in part due to the bare black facial skin and the relatively long, hooked bill. This rather vulture-like profile is the reason behind its alternative common name.

Behaviour
Pesquet's parrot is a highly specialised frugivore, feeding almost exclusively on a few species of figs. Flowers and nectar have also been reported. In parts of its range, it is seasonally nomadic in response to the availability of fruits. The bare part of the head is presumably an adaptation to avoid feather-matting from sticky fruits.

Little is known about its breeding habits in the wild.  Typically it lays two eggs in a nest in a large, hollow tree.

It is typically seen in pairs or groups up to 20 individuals. In flight, it alternates between rapid flapping and short glides.

Status
Its feathers are highly prized. This, combined with high prices in aviculture, has resulted in overhunting. Habitat loss also presents an ongoing problem. For these reasons, it is evaluated as Vulnerable on the IUCN Red List of Threatened Species. Pesquet's parrot is listed on Appendix II of CITES.

Gallery

References

 Collar, N. J. (1997). "Pesquet's Parrot (Psittrichas fulgidus)". P. 362 in: del Hoyo, J., Elliott, A. & Sargatal, J. eds. (1997). Handbook of the Birds of the World. Vol. 4. Sandgrouse to Cuckoos. Lynx Edicions, Barcelona. .
 Juniper, T. & Parr, M. (1998). A Guide to the Parrots of the World. Pica Press, East Sussex. .

External links 

 BirdLife Species Factsheet
 Red Data Book

Pesquet's parrot
Birds of New Guinea
Pesquet's parrot
Taxa named by René Lesson